Brilhante is a Brazilian telenovela produced and broadcast by TV Globo. It premiered on 28 September 1981 and ended on 26 March 1982, with a total of 155 episodes. It's the twenty seventh "novela das oito" to be aired on the timeslot. It is created and written by Gilberto Braga and directed by Daniel Filho.

Cast

References

External links 
 

TV Globo telenovelas
1981 telenovelas
Brazilian telenovelas
1981 Brazilian television series debuts
1982 Brazilian television series endings
Brazilian LGBT-related television shows
Telenovelas by Gilberto Braga
Portuguese-language telenovelas
Television shows set in Rio de Janeiro (city)